The Taiwanese gray shrew (Crocidura tanakae) is a species of mammal in the family Soricidae. Previously believed to be endemic to Taiwan, it is now also known to occur in Vietnam.

References

Crocidura
Mammals of Taiwan
Mammals of Vietnam
Mammals described in 1938
Taxa named by Nagamichi Kuroda